Ormond railway station is located on the Frankston line in Victoria, Australia. It serves the south-eastern Melbourne suburb of Ormond, and opened on 19 December 1881 as North Road. It was renamed Ormond on 1 September 1897.

History
Ormond station opened on 19 December 1881, when the railway line from Caulfield was extended to Mordialloc. Like the suburb itself, the station was named after Francis Ormond, a grazier and philanthropist in religion and education. Ormond was later elected to the Parliament of Victoria in 1882 as a member of the Legislative Council.

In 1922, the station was closed to goods traffic. A siding at the station was removed in that same year.

In 1968, boom barriers replaced interlocked gates at the former North Road level crossing, which was located at the down end of the station. In 1974, all interlocking at the station was abolished. Also in that year, an island platform and a side platform for services operating in the down direction was provided.

On 28 June 1987, the up face of the former surface-level island platform was brought into use.

On 4 May 2010, as part of the 2010/2011 State Budget, $83.7 million was allocated to upgrade Ormond to a Premium Station, along with nineteen others. However, in March 2011, this was scrapped by the Baillieu Government.

In May 2014, the Victorian Government announced a grade separation project to remove the North Road level crossing, requiring the station to be rebuilt. On 25 March 2016, the station temporarily closed, to allow its demolition and rebuilding below ground level. On 29 August of that year, the rebuilt station opened.

Platforms and services
Ormond has one island platform with two faces and one side platform. In the morning peak-hour, Frankston-bound services use Platform 3, with Flinders Street-bound services using Platforms 1 and 2. At other times, Frankston-bound services use Platform 2.

The station is served by Frankston line trains.

Platform 1:
  all stations services to Flinders Street, Werribee and Williamstown

Platform 2:
  all stations services to Flinders Street, Werribee and Williamstown; all stations services to Frankston

Platform 3:
  morning peak-hour all stations services to Frankston

Transport links
CDC Melbourne operates two bus routes via Ormond station, under contract to Public Transport Victoria:
 : Elsternwick – Chadstone Shopping Centre
 : Elwood – Monash University Clayton Campus

Gallery

References

External links
 Melway map

Railway stations in Melbourne
Railway stations in Australia opened in 1881
Railway stations in the City of Glen Eira